1,1,1-Tribromoethane is a haloalkane with the chemical formula CHBr.

References

Tribromomethyl compounds